"L・O・V・E U" is the third single by J-pop singer Leah Dizon. The title song was described as a "summer up-beat song" in initial press statements. It was released on August 8, 2007 and came in two versions, a limited edition CD+DVD version and a CD only version. The song was used as the commercial song for the Shueisha magazine "Pinky".

Track listing
 L・O・V・E U
 Brand New Day

DVD track listing
 L・O・V・E U (promo video)
 Making-of Footage (video clip)

Charts

Leah Dizon songs
2007 singles
2007 songs
Victor Entertainment singles